Unleashed is an album by Los Angeles hip-hop group L.A. Symphony. It is their last album before going on hiatus.

Track listing 

 "DL Drop" - 2:31
 "Idle Times" - 3:37
 "All We Know" - 3:12
 "Universal" - 3:45 featuring Posdnous [produced by Madlib]
 "Chocolate City Drop" - 2:27
 "Ball Bounces" - 3:29
 "C. Rap" - 2:47
 "I Speak" - 2:53
 "Love for the Art" - 3:04
 "Break It Down" - 3:11
 "Friday Night Flavas Drop" - 2:11
 "Passionate" - 3:36
 "Copywrite" - 3:41
 "Get out the Van" - 2:40
 "Soul Bros." - 3:22
 "Tour Bus" - 3:47
 "We Came from Beyond Drop" - 2:07
 "Church" - 3:42
 "Up Down" - 3:04
 "Girl, Interrupted" - 3:01
 "You Mash Up" - 2:45
 Global Takeover - 3:54

Awards

In 2008, the album was nominated for a Dove Award for Rap/Hip-Hop Album of the Year at the 39th GMA Dove Awards.

References

2007 albums
LA Symphony albums
Albums produced by Madlib